Margaret Beck (later Margaret Lockwood; born 1952) is a retired badminton player from England who ranked among the world's best during most of the 1970s.

Playing career
An exceptional junior talent, she represented England and won women's singles gold medal at the 1970 British Commonwealth Games in Edinburgh, Scotland, while still in her teens.

In 1973, Beck won the women's singles at the All-England Championships, which, aside from the international team championships (Uber Cup and Thomas Cup), was then the world's most prestigious tournament.

She shared the All-England women's doubles title with Gillian Gilks in 1974. She won singles at the World Invitation Tournament, a forerunner of the BWF World Championships, that was held in Jakarta, Indonesia in 1974. In 1974 she represented England and won a gold and silver medals in the doubles and singles, at the 1974 British Commonwealth Games in Christchurch, New Zealand.

After marrying in 1975 she competed under her married name of Margaret Lockwood and reached the singles and doubles final at the 1976 All England Open Badminton Championships.

Her other international singles titles included the European Badminton Championships (1972), and the Canadian (1975), Irish (1971), Portuguese (1973), Scottish (1972, 1974), and South African (1976) Opens. She also won five English National singles titles (against opposition that included Gillian Gilks), and a dozen or more international doubles titles.

Noted for her rigorous fitness regimen, she developed a problem with her knee which was seriously aggravated during the first World Badminton Championships in 1977. The singles and doubles bronze medals that she earned there would be her last. Despite surgeries and attempted rehabilitation she never played serious competitive badminton again.

Achievements

World Championships

Commonwealth Games

European Championships

European Junior Championships

International tournaments

References

1952 births
Living people
English female badminton players
Badminton players at the 1970 British Commonwealth Games
Badminton players at the 1974 British Commonwealth Games
Commonwealth Games medallists in badminton
Commonwealth Games gold medallists for England
Commonwealth Games silver medallists for England
Medallists at the 1970 British Commonwealth Games
Medallists at the 1974 British Commonwealth Games